Nicholas Miller (born 1 May 1993) is a British track and field athlete who specialises in the hammer throw. He was the gold medallist at the 2018 Commonwealth Games and 2022 Commonwealth Games, a silver medallist at the 2014 Commonwealth Games and the gold medal at the 2015 European Athletics U23 Championships.

He represented Great Britain at the 2012 World Junior Championships in Athletics and the 2013 European Athletics U23 Championships. He studied at Oklahoma State University and is a five-time Big 12 Conference champion (three times in hammer, twice in weight throw). He is also a two-time runner-up at the NCAA Championships.

Career

Early life and career
Born and raised in Carlisle, Cumbria, he became interested in athletics after working with Jack Harper-Tarr, a physical education teacher and athletics judge. Miller began training in throwing events at the local club, Border Harriers & Athletics Club, where Harper-Tarr coached. Miller preferred individual sports and also took part in karate, winning a national youth age-category competition. Initially, he competed in a variety of track and field throwing events, but he became increasingly interested in the hammer throw after seeing a rival youngster throw beyond sixty metres.

Miller achieved this feat himself with the 5 kg implement in 2009, winning the Cumbria Schools Championships. He repeated as champion the following year and also won the English Schools Championships title. After finishing at William Howard School, he gained an athletic scholarship to study a multi-disciplinary degree at the Oklahoma State University. In joining the American college, he followed in the footsteps of a fellow Border Harrier, distance runner Tom Farrell, who began studying there in 2010.

Move to Oklahoma
Miller began to compete athletically for the Oklahoma State Cowboys team and took up the weight throw event. His throwing coach, John Baumann, had trained several Olympians, including Gia Lewis-Smallwood. Miller was runner-up at his first major college event, the 2012 Big 12 Conference indoor championships. He was the champion of the Big 12 Outdoor Championship, becoming Oklahoma State's first conference hammer throw winner since 1901. In July that year he had another best with a mark of  before going on to represent Great Britain in the qualifiers at the 2012 World Junior Championships in Athletics.

In the hammer he cleared seventy metres for the first time at the Mt. SAC Relays. He gave his worst performance of the season at the NCAA Outdoor finals, finishing in ninth place with a sub-65-metre throw. He was similarly off his best at the 2013 European Athletics U23 Championships, where he also ended the competition in ninth place.

He also defended his Big 12 indoor title that season. He won a third straight Big 12 outdoor hammer title with a throw of  – a personal best, school record, stadium record, and Big 12 Conference record. His winning margin was more than fifteen metres. He was runner-up in the NCAA Outdoor hammer throw that year, second only to Matthias Tayala.

Commonwealth medal
He won his first senior international selection for the 2014 European Team Championships and placed fifth for Great Britain. This led to his inclusion in the English team for the 2014 Commonwealth Games and at the event in Glasgow he threw  to take the silver medal behind James Steacy – Miller's first international medal. In spite of this, Miller said "a little bit of me is a bit upset I didn't win but part of me is just 'what a fantastic achievement'".
Won gold in the hammerthrow at the 2022 commonwealth games in Birmingham

Personal bests
Hammer throw –  (Commonwealth Games 2018)
Shot put –  (2012)
Weight throw –  (2014)
Discus throw –  (2013)
Javelin throw –  (2010)

International competitions

References

External links
 Nick Miller at British Athletics
 
 
 
 
 
 

Living people
1993 births
Sportspeople from Carlisle, Cumbria
Track and field athletes from Oklahoma
British male hammer throwers
English male hammer throwers
Olympic male hammer throwers
Olympic athletes of Great Britain
Athletes (track and field) at the 2016 Summer Olympics
Commonwealth Games gold medallists for England
Commonwealth Games silver medallists for England
Commonwealth Games gold medallists in athletics
Commonwealth Games medallists in athletics
Athletes (track and field) at the 2014 Commonwealth Games
Athletes (track and field) at the 2018 Commonwealth Games
Athletes (track and field) at the 2022 Commonwealth Games
World Athletics Championships athletes for Great Britain
British Athletics Championships winners
Oklahoma State Cowboys track and field athletes
Athletes (track and field) at the 2020 Summer Olympics
Medallists at the 2014 Commonwealth Games
Medallists at the 2018 Commonwealth Games
Medallists at the 2022 Commonwealth Games